Ghareeb Kaawar, known professionally as Djsky, is a Lebanese electronic music DJ, music programmer, remixer and event organiser based in Ghana, United States and Lebanon. In an interview with Watsup TV, Djsky revealed he was the first to introduce electronic dance music into Ghana music. In 2021, Djsky released new viral music named after his newborn Milagros, featuring Ken & Seth music that garnered over 10 million views across all digital platforms which has appeared on Times Square.

Early life
Kaawar graduated from Ghazieh High School in 2007 and studied at the Lebanese American University. He also holds professional certificates from International Business Management Institute (IBMI), Berklee College of Music, Udemy and Alison.

Career and performances
DjSky set a recent record when he garnered over 50 million views on Instagram within a week of performing an Amapiano and Afrohouse freestyle whiles on vacation in the forest

 Loud Street Festival Beirut 2016 
 Unite for Tomorrowland (festival) UAE 2016
 Ultra Music Festival,South Africa 2017
 Djakarta Warehouse Project,Indonesia 2017
 Asa Bakko Music Festival, Busua Beach 2018 
 Sky Show 1 & 2, Ghana 2018
 Asa Bakko music Festival, Busua Beach 2019
 JD Music Festival, West Africa 2019 (Opining)
 Hey Ibïza 1&2, 2019 
 Straight Outta Naija, 2019
 Jack & Afro A&C Mall, Accra 2019
 Sunset Music Festival, Busua Beach 2020 
 Sunset electronic music SKYBAR Alto Tower Ghana 2020 
 DJRAVE Worldwide show 2020
 The top 10 show music program on WatsUp TV 2020
 Spit on It Music Program live on WatsUp TV 2020
 Quarantine performances on BBC Radio 1, One World Radio and Mixmag
 Hey Ibïza 3 Alto Tower SKYBAR 2020 
 Djsky live from home to support United Nations WHO, Donate to COVID-19 BBC Radio 2021
 DjSky Ultimate Balcony Mix with Major League DJz 2022

References 

Ghanaian DJs
Lebanese DJs
Living people
1991 births
Electronic dance music DJs